Bang Khun Non is a khwaeng (subdistrict) of Bangkok Noi District, in Bangkok, Thailand. In 2018, it had a total population of 9,549 people.

Its name after Khlong Bang Khun Non, a canal runs through the area. In the olden days Bang Khun Non was the area of orchards, the principle career of Bang Khun Non residents was doing the orchards, by the form of the former orchard was rising up the embankment to be the furrows. The fruits which the gardeners favored to plant were durian, pomelo, Marian plum, Burmese grape, mangosteen, rose apple, coconut palm, mango, etc. Especially, durian was very famous until it was admired to be the name of a kind of durian, that was "Bang Khun Non Durian" paired with "Taling Chan Durian" of adjacent district Taling Chan.

At present, Bangkok Noi District Office has conserved these durian species in Chaloem Phrakiat 80 Phansa Public Park. It is located catty-corner from the district office on Bang Khun Non Road.

Besides, in the area of Bang Khun Non there is a historical site, Wat Si Sudaram (formerly Wat Chi Pakhao), as in the past this monastery was the primary school in the childhood of a Thai famous poet, Sunthorn Phu.

Nowadays, the life style of people are changed, roads are the main role instead of canals, lands for residential are needed, therefore forms of former orchards are slightly faded and changed to be the plants nurseries, and decorative plants for sales.

References

Subdistricts of Bangkok
Bangkok Noi district
Neighbourhoods of Bangkok